is a former volleyball player from Japan, who played for the Japan men's national volleyball team in the 1990s. Playing at the 1992 Summer Olympics in Barcelona, Spain he ended up in 16th place at the 1998 World Championship. On 26 October 2017, Nakagaichi became the head coach of the Japan men's national volleyball team and he retired in September 2021, after led the team finished as runners-up in 2021 Asian Men's Volleyball Championship.

Controversies 
In November 2016, shortly after an announcement of becoming Japan men's national team new head coach, he was suspected of negligence in allegedly hitting a 41-year-old traffic guard while driving on the Chugoku Expressway in the city of Shobara, Hiroshima prefecture, on November 9. Nakagaichi told the police that he mistakenly applied the brake of his car, causing it to skid and plow into the victim, according to police officers.

In 2017, The Japan Volleyball Association is considering a temporary replacement for him after his stepped back from the role following his involvement. The association retained Nakagaichi as coach under the expectation that a criminal charge will be handed down within three months.

Honours

As player 

1992 Olympic Games — 6th place
1998 FIVB Volleyball Men's World Championship — 16th place

As coach 
2017 Asian Men's Volleyball Championship —  Champion
2017 FIVB Volleyball World League — 17th place
2017 FIVB Volleyball Men's World Grand Champions Cup — 6th place
2018 FIVB Volleyball Men's Nations League — 12th place
2018 FIVB Volleyball Men's World Championship — 17th place
2018 Asian Men's Volleyball Cup —  3rd place
2018 Asian Games — 5th place
2019 FIVB Volleyball Men's Nations League — 10th place
2019 Asian Men's Volleyball Championship —  3rd place
2019 FIVB Volleyball Men's World Cup — 4th place
2021 FIVB Volleyball Men's Nations League — 11th place
2020 Summer Olympics (was held in 2021) — 7th place
2021 Asian Men's Volleyball Championship —  Runners-up

References

See also 
 Osaka Blazers Sakai Official Profile

1967 births
Living people
Japanese men's volleyball players
Japanese volleyball coaches
People from Fukui (city)
Sportspeople from Fukui Prefecture
Volleyball players at the 1992 Summer Olympics
Olympic volleyball players of Japan
Asian Games medalists in volleyball
Volleyball players at the 1990 Asian Games
Volleyball players at the 1994 Asian Games
Medalists at the 1990 Asian Games
Medalists at the 1994 Asian Games
Asian Games gold medalists for Japan
Asian Games bronze medalists for Japan
20th-century Japanese people